Mathura Prasad Mishra (1918 – 17 July 1987) was an Indian politician. He was elected to the first, second and third Lok Sabha, the lower house of the Parliament of India from Begusarai, Bihar as a member of the Indian National Congress for consecutively three terms.

Mishra died in Pune, Maharashtra on 17 July 1987, at the age of 69.

References

External links
Official biographical sketch on the Parliament of India website

1918 births
1987 deaths
India MPs 1952–1957
India MPs 1957–1962
India MPs 1962–1967
Indian National Congress politicians
Indian National Congress politicians from Bihar
Lok Sabha members from Bihar